Lipno  is a village in the administrative district of Gmina Przysucha, within Przysucha County, Masovian Voivodeship, in east-central Poland.

The village has a population of 240.

References

Lipno